is a Japanese manga series written and illustrated by Yoshinori Natsume. It was serialized in Shogakukan's Weekly Shōnen Sunday from August 2004 to January 2006 and compiled into seven tankōbon volumes. In North America, the manga was licensed for English release by Viz Media.

Plot
Sakurai Mikito is a high school student and is bullied everyday, but doesn't fight back, as he dislikes violence. One day a mysterious orb works its way into his bag and while Mikito sleeps the orb bounces to his bed, works its way into his mouth and he swallows it. In his dreams he talks to a strange boy who is called Zakuro, who asks simply "what is your desire?" After Mikito wakes up he no longer needs his glasses and has a massive appetite. When the bullies at school attempt to extort him for money, but Mikito is overcome with an unfamiliar sensation, Rage. when Mikito refuses to pay the bullies coerce him saying "you will always be lower than us!" Mikito, finds this comment to his disliking and promptly breaks the delinquent's jaw with a single punch. Apparently, he has also gained superhuman strength, later a large group try again to extort him, however, this time he brutally beats them down discovering he enjoys the sight of blood after hating it for so long. Unfortunately his power comes with a price, he starts harboring violent thoughts, becomes short tempered and most disturbingly, starts to view other humans as "Meat" even nearly attacking his own sister. He develops an insane hunger for human flesh which he refuses to indulge, but his instincts are difficult to repress. Then one night he senses something off in the distance, a person he must meet. He rushes towards this person, and finds a man standing over the corpse of a woman whom he killed. At first the man is confused by Mikito's presence then identifies him as a comrade. Suddenly a cloaked man carrying strange weapons and wearing a bell on his right ear swoops down from the rooftops and attacks the murderer. Then the murderer changes shape turning into an ogre, the cloaked man an ogre battle for a moment and the man gets the upper hand. The ogre implores Mikito to transform and help. However, the man kills the ogre and attacks Mikito, but his weapon seems to have an effect on him as it saps his strength. With the last of his strength he yells at a fleeing Mikito that, he will kill his family if he doesn't let the cloaked man kill him. Apparently the orb he swallowed was an ogre core which transforms a human into an Ogre. Mikito is then discovered by "Ogre Hunters" and the story develops from there.

Publication
Kurozakuro is written and illustrated by Yoshinori Natsume. It was serialized in Shogakukan's shōnen manga magazine Weekly Shōnen Sunday from August 11, 2004 to January 1, 2006. Shogakukan compiled its individual chapters into seven tankōbon volumes, published from November 18, 2004 to February 17, 2006.

In North America, this series has been licensed by Viz Media with the first volume published in November 2010.

Reception
Carlo Santos from Anime News Network said it had "unfolding in unexpected ways [...] and treating us to an ever-expanding universe." Santos praised the intensity of the art, saying Yoshinori Natsume is the opposite of Rumiko Takahashi and Mitsuru Adachi due to his artwork with "sharp spikes and jags, thick-lined penstrokes, and intense contrasts of black and white." However, he noted this prejudice the character designs and the panel layouts. In another review, Santos praised the fact of Natsume pours his personal philosophy as a creator in the manga: "Of course, just being an exciting, well-paced fight scene doesn't hurt either—but being framed as part of the eternal debate between good and evil is what really completes the scenario." Writing for Comic Book Bin, Chris Zimmerman called 'Kurozakuro volume 1 "a fascinating twist on the super natural genre" since "its premise seems right out of a shōnen title but its characters and the handling of their development is closer in substance to a richly layered psychological thriller rather than a smash-em up title." Zimmerman stated it is "compulsively entertaining" due to the gothic elements but said the artwork looks "simplistic and overly flat". Leroy Douresseaux also from Comic Book Bin described it as "Harry Potter with a dash of Steve Ditko's The Creeper, and this dark fantasy and battle manga is worth your time", and he felt the series ended to early. Kurozakuro has "an intriguing and dark plot perfect" according to ActiveAnime's Whitney Cox that also praised Mikito, the main character. Also from ActiveAnime, Davey C. Jones enjoyed the "[c]ool moves, dire battles and secrets" but qualified the art as "chaotic".

References

External links

2004 manga
Adventure anime and manga
Dark fantasy anime and manga
Shogakukan manga
Shōnen manga
Supernatural anime and manga
Viz Media manga